Sonia Beatriz Ayaucán Ciudad (born 1 April 1969) is a retired Peruvian female volleyball player. She was part of the Peru women's national volleyball team.

She was a member of the Peruvian team that won third place in the World Championship in 1986. She was awarded the prize for the best receiver at the 1990 FIVB Volleyball Women's World Championship and won the title at the 1993 Women's South American Volleyball Championship. On club level she played with Bancoper-Cristal.

Clubs
 Power-Lima (1982-1990)
 GEAS SESTO S.GIOVANNI (1990-1991)
 ORION GEAS SESTO S.GIOVANNI (1991-1992)
 SEIVIAGGI ESSEBI SESTO S.GIOVANNI (1993-1994)

References

External links
 Sonia Ayaucán at Volleybox.net
 Sonia Ayaucan Ciudad at Lega Pallavolo Serie A Femminile 

1969 births
Living people
Peruvian women's volleyball players
Place of birth missing (living people)
Volleyball players at the 1987 Pan American Games
Medalists at the 1987 Pan American Games
Pan American Games silver medalists for Peru
Pan American Games medalists in volleyball
20th-century Peruvian women